Street is a small village in the East Devon district of Devon, England. The village is situated north from the Jurassic Coast World Heritage Site. The village has one pub, named The Fountainhead.

References

Villages in Devon